The Open Fuel Standard Coalition is a bipartisan group in the United States actively working for passage of H.R. 1687, the "Open Fuel Standard Act of 2011." The OFS Coalition views this legislation as the solution to the current energy crisis by the implementing of alternative energy sources into our fuel transportation market sector, thereby breaking our dependence on foreign oil. Specifically, by implementing H.R. 1687, the Open Fuel Standard Act of 2011 all vehicles sold in the US will have to either operate on mixed fuels, containing 85 percent ethanol, methanol, biodiesel, or any other alternative energy source. 

The need for an open fuel standard could not be any clearer as we have seen the rising price of oil in recent years. The continuing unrest and violence in the Middle East has caused dramatic increases in crude oil that remains strongly controlled by OPEC. Our current gasoline consumption from foreign oil is unsustainable for the future. Additionally, our oil addiction is contributing to the financial support of our enemies abroad and unquestionably aiding terrorist organizations. The promise of freeing our dependence on foreign oil has long been stated, but we can no longer kick the can further down the road. Now, both Republicans and Democrats must work together to implement a sensible bipartisan solution to reinvent and revitalize our energy policies. By the end of the 112th session, we hope to quickly move this legislative through congress and enforce the open fuel standard as a policy priority.

Purpose
The open fuel standard will create incentive to promote and invest in the emerging market of ethanol, methanol, biodiesel, and any other alternative fuel. Vehicles with these alternative fuel engines will re-energize our economy and create new jobs here in the U.S. Comparatively, mixed fuels produce less carbon emissions as well as beating the price of oil three to one. The technology and resources are already available for flex-fuel cars, but the availability and access to pumps is scarce. By manufacturing flex-fuel cars, gas stations can create new revenue by adding mixed fuel pumps that offer low cost alternative to gasoline. However, the first step is allowing a demand by opening up the market to producing more flex fuel and alternative fueled cars.
Our foreign competitors, including China and Brazil have already successfully implemented similar regulations on auto industries selling cars in their countries resulting in tremendous success and new manufacturing plants in both China and Brazil. The U.S. cannot stay competitive as we fall behind in the investments of alternative energy and auto industries take their business abroad.

Goal
The goal of the OFS coalition is to pass H.R. 1687, the "Open Fuel Standard Act of 2011" in the 112th United States Congress and generate pressures on the administration and federal departments to take further action.  The OFS Coalition is assisting in providing information about the open fuel standard in an effort to educate Members of the United States Congress, while successfully engaging with various groups to promote the tactical purposes of the open fuel standard and draw attention and support of key Members of Congress.

A web site has been created by the Open Fuel Standard Coalition to help keep interested parties informed about the Open Fuel Standard Act. The purpose of OpenFuelStandard.org is to provide information to citizens who want to help the Open Fuel Standard Act become law. 
1. Practical actions you can take that will help pass the Open Fuel Standard Act of 2011.
2. Information to further educate you on the Open Fuel Standard.
3. Posts you can forward to your friends and family to educate them about the Open Fuel Standard.

Reasons for the Open Fuel Standard
1. Save money. It will bring down gas prices at the pump. The main reason gas is so expensive is that OPEC deliberately lowers its production to raise the price of oil, and we have no real fuel choice at the pump. It is all made of oil. So when OPEC reduces its production and makes oil more expensive, we have no other choice — we must pay it. OPEC knows this, and takes advantage of its leverage. Fuel choice at the pump will be the end of a long-running monopoly.

2. Healthier. The fumes from burning alcohol and other alternatives are less toxic than the fumes from burning gasoline — considerably less toxic to humans and other living things.

3. Better economy. It will generate jobs in the United States. Americans will be building fuel-processing plants, fuel stations, growing the raw materials to make methanol from biomass, growing crops to make ethanol, inventing new kinds of other alternative fuels, and coming up with new ways to make fuel from waste products. American ingenuity will have a field day.

4. Safer. Alcohol is less flammable than gasoline, and therefore less dangerous (less likely to explode). Alcohol burns cooler than gasoline, too, which also makes it less dangerous.

5. Cooler. Alcohol fuels will put less carbon into the air. To drill for oil, you're taking carbon out from underneath the surface of the earth and burning it, adding carbon to the air that wasn't already there. But to make ethanol and methanol, you use plant material. So the plant pulls carbon out of the air, and then when it is burned as fuel, it returns the same carbon back into the air.

6. Expensive. Manufacturing a car with flex-fuel capability adds to the price of a car. It comprises many relatively small tweaks, usually adding around one hundred dollars to the cost (not the price) of a new car.  Typically, it requires all metal components within the fuel system to be changed to stainless steel and all hoses and o-rings require the substitution of specialist ethanol and methanol-resistant fluoroelastomers

7. Cheaper. It doesn't cost the federal government any money.

8. Environmentally friendly. An "alcohol spill" would not be a disaster like an oil spill. Alcohol dissolves in water and is readily consumed by bacteria. Within a few days of an Exxon-sized ethanol or methanol spill, the ocean would be back to normal.

9. Security. The fuel competition at the pump will reduce the amount of money going to regimes hostile to America (and hostile to their own populations). These regimes are dangerous for the world, and their enormous revenues give them power and influence around the world. Democracies would be better off if those regimes didn't have their inexhaustible wealth to wield.

10. Freedom. The bill requires 95 percent of cars to be capable of burning any alternative fuel by 2017, leaving the choice up to the automaker. Because the Open Fuel Standard Act of 2011 does not pick a winner, every alternative fuel can compete against gasoline, thereby allowing consumer choice. Cars could be electric, hydrogen, natural gas, bio-diesel, or any other non-gasoline alternative and qualify under the Act. This is the only technology-neutral bill, meaning that it doesn't favor any particular option and allows the market to decide which innovative solution will win out.

References

Sustainable energy
Political organizations based in the United States